Basanta Kumar Das may refer to:
 Basanta Kumar Das (Indian politician) (1898–1984)
 Basanta Kumar Das (Pakistani politician) (fl. 1955–1958), East Pakistan / Bangladesh politician
 Basanta Kumar Das (ichthyologist) (1899–1957), Indian zoologist